Wendy A. Woloson is an American historian. She is a professor at Rutgers University-Camden, specializing in the "history of material and consumer culture, used goods markets, alternative and criminal economies, and the history of capitalism".

Education
Woloson graduated from Iowa State University in 1986 with a BFA in Drawing, Painting, Printmaking and a minor in art history. In 1990, she received an MFA in Printmaking from Montana State University. In 1993, she received a MA in Popular Culture from Bowling Green State University. Her thesis was titled "In Our Homes We Must Have Industry and Sympathy: Early Twentieth-Century Advertising Recipe Booklets and American Domestic Culture". In 1999, she received her PhD in American Studies from the University of Pennsylvania. Her dissertation was "Refined Tastes: Sugar, Confectionery, and Consumers in Nineteenth-Century America" which she later published as a book in 2002.

Career
For ten years, Woloson worked as the Curator of Printed Books at the Library Company of Philadelphia.

She has been a professor at Rutgers-Camden since 2013.

Awards and honors
Her book Crap: A History of Cheap Goods in America was a finalist for the 2020 National Book Critics Circle Award in criticism.

Books
Crap: A History of Cheap Goods in America (University of Chicago Press, 2020)
coeditor with Brian P. Luskey of the collection, Capitalism by Gaslight: Illuminating the Economy of 19th-Century America (University of Pennsylvania Press, 2015)
In Hock: Pawning in America from Independence through the Great Depression (University of Chicago Press, 2010)
Refined Tastes Sugar, Confectionery, and Consumers in Nineteenth-Century America (The Johns Hopkins University Press, 2002).

References

External links
 Repository of Useful Knowledge | "The Repo": reclaiming the past for the digital age

American women historians
Iowa State University alumni
Montana State University
Bowling Green State University alumni
University of Pennsylvania School of Arts and Sciences alumni
20th-century American historians
20th-century American women writers
21st-century American historians
21st-century American women writers
Year of birth missing (living people)
Living people